Bridgman is a surname, and may refer to:

 David Bridgman, Australian architect
 Elijah Coleman Bridgman (1801–1861), American missionary in China
 Frederick Arthur Bridgman (1847-1928), American artist
 George Bridgman (1865-1943), anatomist and artist
 Jon Bridgman, American historian
 Laura Bridgman (1829-1889), deaf-blind American
 Margaret Bridgman, former Canadian member of parliament
 Mel Bridgman, ice hockey player
 Percy Williams Bridgman (1882–1961), American physicist and 1946 Nobel laureate
 Peter Bridgman, Australian author, lawyer, public policy specialist

See also

 Bridgman, Michigan
 Bridgman (crater)
 Bridgeman